Ascochyta fabae is a plant pathogen.

See also
List of Ascochyta species

References

External links
 USDA ARS Fungal Database

Fungal plant pathogens and diseases
Pleosporales
Fungi described in 1885